Andrew Foley may refer to:
Andrew Foley (writer) Canadian writer, editor, and artist of comic books and graphic novels
Andrew Foley (MP) (1748–1818), youngest son of Thomas Foley, 1st Baron Foley, and MP for Droitwich from 1774 to 1818 
Andrew Foley (Home and Away), fictional character in Australian soap opera Home and Away
Andrew Foley Senior, father of the above